Lauri "Louis" or "Big Louie" Moilanen (January 5, 1886 – September 16, 1913), was a Finnish-born giant, who holds the record of being Michigan's tallest man.

Biography
He was the son of Louis and Annie Moilanen. At the age of 4, he and his family emigrated from Finland and settled in the town of Hancock, Michigan in the United States.

As an adult he was a miner and bartender. He also worked with the Ringling Brothers Circus as a sideshow attraction to exhibit his great height. Buying clothes was difficult, so the Ed Haas Mens Store in Houghton tailored clothes for Louis and special ordered size 19 shoes, and size 9 stetson hats.

In 1913, he became violently ill, and he died from tubercular meningitis.

In 2013, a monument to "Big Louie" Moilanen was opened in front of the Finnish American Heritage Center in Hancock, Michigan.

References

1886 births
1913 deaths
People with gigantism
American people of Finnish descent
20th-century deaths from tuberculosis
Tuberculosis deaths in Michigan
Finnish-American culture in Michigan